The Sri Lanka women's national football team is the female representative football team for Sri Lanka.
As of 2014 the national team has never entered qualifying for the FIFA Women's World Cup nor the AFC Women's Asian Cup.

The team has played in all three editions of the South Asian SAFF Women's Championship, where it reached the semi-finals in 2012 and 2014.

History 

Sri Lanka women's national football team played their first game in 2010 against India which they lost 8–1. Sri Lanka women's national football team had never played in FIFA Women's World Cup or AFC Women's Asia Cup nor entered the qualifications. They have played in the SAFF Women's Championship and in the South Asian Games. Due to their lack of experience they didn't show any great performance in the regional level of football. But they have qualified for the Semi Finals of 2012 and 2014 SAFF Women's Championships.
 
Sri Lanka made their continental level football debut in the 2016 Summer Olympic Qualifiers when they were soundly beaten 16–0 by Myanmar. In the next game they were defeated by India. In 2016 they participated in the South Asian Games but lost all of their matches in the football tournament. Sri Lanka participated in the 4th SAFF Women's Championship in 2016 but they failed to reach the semi finals after a shock defeat to Maldives which are ranked below them.

Coaching staff

Players

Current squad
 This is the squad which participated in 2019 SAFF Women's Championship.

Notable players
 Erandi Liyanage

Results and Fixtures 

The following is a list of match results in the last 12 months, as well as any future matches that have been scheduled.

Legend

2022

2023

All-time records

Competitive record

FIFA Women's World Cup

AFC Women's Asian Cup

SAFF Women's Championship

See also 
 Sri Lanka national football team
 Sri Lanka national under-23 football team
 Sri Lanka national under-20 football team
 Sri Lanka national under-17 football team

References

External links 
 Official website
 Sri Lanka women's national football team on FIFA

 
Asian women's national association football teams
Football in Sri Lanka